"What You Talking About!?" is a single by Redlight featuring vocals from Ms. Dynamite. It was released on 30 August 2010 as a digital download in the United Kingdom. The song peaked at number 38 on the UK Dance Chart.

Music video
A music video to accompany the release of "What You Talking About!?" was first released onto YouTube on 11 August 2010 at a total length of three minutes and six seconds. Music critics noted similarities between the styles in the video to that of M.I.A. and her protege, Rye Rye.

Track listing
Digital download
 "What You Talking About!?" (feat. Ms Dynamite) - 3:19
 "What You Talking About!?" (Radio Edit) [feat. Ms Dynamite] - 2:37
 "What You Talking About!?" (Accapella) [feat. Ms Dynamite] - 3:12
 "What You Talking About!?" (Roska Remix) [feat. Ms Dynamite] - 5:55
 "MDMA" - 3:19
 "Chopsticks" - 3:20

Chart performance

Release history

References

Redlight (musician) songs
Ms. Dynamite songs
2010 singles
MTA Records singles
2010 songs
Songs written by Ms. Dynamite